Anthony Bancarel (born 15 May 1971) is a French former professional footballer played as a striker.

He is best known as a member of the Girondins Bordeaux team that reached the UEFA Cup final in 1996, losing to Bayern Munich. He had previously been part of the side that won the 1995 UEFA Intertoto Cup.

References

External links

1971 births
Living people
People from Millau
Sportspeople from Aveyron
French footballers
Association football forwards
Ligue 1 players
Toulouse FC players
FC Girondins de Bordeaux players
Stade Malherbe Caen players
En Avant Guingamp players
FC Sion players
Ligue 2 players
US Créteil-Lusitanos players
AC Ajaccio players
Footballers from Occitania (administrative region)